This is a list of the first minority male lawyer(s) and judge(s) in Florida. It includes the year in which the men were admitted to practice law (in parentheses). Also included are other distinctions such as the first minority men in their state to graduate from law school or become a political figure.

Firsts in Florida's history

Lawyers 

First African American male: Harvey S. Harmon (1869)  
First Italian American male: Anthony J. DiMedio (1925)
First openly gay male: Robert Eimers (1976) 
First undocumented male: Jose Godinez-Samperio (2014)

State judges 

First African American male elected: James Dean (1884) in 1888  
First African American male (municipal court): Lawson E. Thomas (1923) in 1950
 First African American male (Florida Supreme Court): Joseph W. Hatchett (1959) in 1975  
 First Hispanic American male: Mario P. Goderich  
 First Jewish American male (Florida Supreme Court): Arthur J. England, Jr. (1961) in 1975 
 First Hispanic American male (Seventeenth Judicial Circuit): Jose Alejandro Gonzalez Jr. (1957) 
 First African American male (Eleventh Judicial Circuit Court): Wilkie D. Ferguson (c. 1960s) in 1977 
First African American male (Fourth Judicial Circuit): Henry Lee Adams Jr. (1969) in 1979 
First African American male (Third District Court of Appeal): Wilkie D. Ferguson (c. 1960s) in 1980  
First African American male (Seventh Judicial Circuit): Hubert Grimes in 1988  
 First African American male (Chief Justice; Florida Supreme Court): Leander J. Shaw Jr. (1952) in 1990 
 First openly gay male: Rand Hoch in 1992
 First Haitian American male: Fred Seraphin in 2001  
First Korean American male: Sonny Im (1991) in 2002  
 First Hispanic American male (Florida Supreme Court): Raoul G. Cantero III (1985) in 2002  
First African American male (Eighteenth Judicial Circuit): James E.C. Perry in 2003  
First Hispanic American male (Seventh Judicial Circuit): Raul A. Zambrano in 2005  
 First Hispanic American male (U.S. Court of Appeals for the Eleventh Circuit): Adalberto Jordan (1987) in 2012

Federal judges 
 First African American male (Northern District Court of Florida): Stephan P. Mickle in 1970 
 First Hispanic American male (U.S. District Court for the Southern District of Florida): Jose Alejandro Gonzalez Jr. (1957) in 1978 
First openly gay African American male (U.S. District Court for the Southern District of Florida): Darrin P. Gayles (1993) in 2014  
First openly gay male (U.S. District Court for the Middle District of Florida): Mac McCoy in 2015  
First South Asian American male (U.S. District Court for the Southern District of Florida): Anuraag Singhal (1989) in 2019

Assistant Attorney General of Florida 

 First African American male: Charles F. Wilson in 1963

United States Attorney 

 First Cuban American male (Southern District of Florida): Roberto Martinez

State Attorney 

 First Hispanic American male: E.J. Salcines

Assistant State Attorney 

 First African American male (Second Judicial Circuit): Roosevelt Randolph 
 First African American male (Chief Assistant State Attorney; Fourth Judicial Circuit): Brian J. Davis (1980) in 1994

Public Defender 

 First Hispanic American male elected: Carlos J. Martinez in 2008

Assistant Public Defender 

 First African American male: Delano Stewart in 1966

Florida Bar Association 

 First African American male admitted (post-Reconstruction Era): James Weldon Johnson (1897) 
 First Jewish American male president: Burton Young in 1970  
First Hispanic American male (Cuban descent) president: Stephen Zack in 1989  
First Cuban-born male president: Frank Angones in 2007 
 First African American male president: Eugene K. Pettis in 2013

Firsts in local history 

 Charles Wilson: First African-American male in Tampa Bay appointed to the Eleventh Circuit of Florida
 Elijah Smiley: First African American male to serve as the Chief Judge of the Fourteenth Judicial Circuit in Florida (2015) [Bay, Calhoun, Gulf, Holmes, Jackson and Washington Counties, Florida]
 James E.C. Perry: First African American male to serve on the  Eighteenth Judicial Circuit in Florida (2003) [Brevard and Seminole Counties, Florida]
 Hubert Grimes: First African American male to serve on the  Seventh Judicial Circuit in Florida (1988) [Flagler, Putnam, St. John's and Volusia Counties, Florida]
 Stephen Everett: First African American male to serve on the  Second Judicial Circuit in Florida (2019) [Franklin, Gadsden, Jefferson, Leon, Liberty and Wakulla Counties, Florida]
 Stephan P. Mickle (1970): First African American male judge in Alachua County, Florida. He later became the first African American district judge of the Northern District of Florida.
 Theodore R. Bowers (1962): First African American lawyer in Bay County, Florida
 Jose Alejandro Gonzalez Jr. (1957): First Hispanic American male to serve on the Broward Circuit Court (1964)
 Thomas J. "T.J." Reddick Jr.: First African American male to serve as a circuit court judge in Broward County, Florida (1972)
 Robert Lee: First openly LGBT male judge in Broward County, Florida (1997)
 Anuraag Singhal (1989): First South Asian American male judge in Broward County, Florida (2011)
 Abraham Bellamy (1822): First male lawyer to settle in Jacksonville, Duval County, Florida
 Joseph E. Lee (1873): First African American male lawyer in Jacksonville, Duval County, Florida
 Francis M. Robles (c. 1890): First Hispanic American male lawyer in Hillsborough County, Florida. He would later become a judge.
 M. Henry Cohen (1894) and Samuel Borchardt (1895): First Jewish American male lawyers in Hillsborough County, Florida
 Peter W. Bryant (c. 1898): First African American male lawyer in Hillsborough County, Florida
 George Edgecomb: First African American male judge in Hillsborough County, Florida
 Ignatio C. "Nelson" Spoto: First Italian American male judge in Hillsborough County, Florida (1949)
 Martin Caraballo: First Latino American male to serve as the President of the Hillsborough County Bar Association (1919)
 Lanse Scriven: First African American male to serve as the President of the Hillsborough County Bar Association. He is also the first African American member of the Florida Bar Board of Governors from Hillsborough County.
 Ted Taylor: First African American male lawyer in Plant City, Hillsborough County, Florida
 William Castagna: First Italian American male to serve as a federal judge in Tampa, Florida
 Casimiro Hernandez: First Latino American male to serve as the judge of the Ybor City Justice of the Peace Court
 Armstrong Purdee: First African American male lawyer in Jackson County, Florida
 Isaac Anderson, Jr.: First African American male judge in Lee County, Florida (1981)
 Augustus D. Aikens: First African American male judge in Leon County, Florida
 Remus Allen: First African American male to serve as the Assistant Public Defender of Leon County, Florida
 Layon Robinson: First African American male lawyer in Manatee County, Florida
 Willie E. Gary: First African American male lawyer in Martin County, Florida
 Lawson E. Thomas (1923): First African American male judge in Miami, Florida (1950) [Miami-Dade County, Florida]
 Calvin Mapp: First African American male county court judge in Miami-Dade County, Florida
 Wilkie D. Ferguson (c. 1960s): First African American male to serve on the  Dade County Circuit Court (1977)
 Frank Angones: First Cuban-born male to serve as the president of the Miami-Dade County Bar Association, Florida
 James Dean (1884): First African American male elected as a county court judge in Monroe County, Florida (1888)
 James C. Collier (c. 1950): First African American male lawyer in Orlando, Orange County, Florida
 Emerson R. Thompson Jr.: First African American male judge in Orange County, Florida (1976)
 Mel Martínez (1973): First Hispanic American male lawyer in Orlando, Orange County, Florida
 William Meredith "Bill" Holland Sr.: First African American male lawyer in West Palm Beach, Palm Beach County, Florida
 Edward Rodgers: First African American prosecutor, judge, and chief judge in Palm Beach County, Florida
 Bradley Harper: First African American male elected as a Judge of the Palm Beach County Circuit Court (2016)
 Luis Delgado: First Hispanic American male elected as a Judge of the Palm Beach County Circuit Court (2016)
 James B. Sanderlin (1963): First African American male judge in Pinellas County, Florida
 Thomas E. Stringer, Sr.: First African American male to graduate from the Stetson University College of Law (1974) [Pinellas County, Florida]
 David Wilson III: First African American male lawyer in Winter Haven, Florida [Polk County, Florida]
 Ralph Flowers: First African American male judge in St. Lucie County, Florida
 Emerson R. Thompson Jr.: First African American male to serve as a Judge of the Fifth District Court of Appeal in Daytona Beach, Florida (1993) [Volusia County, Florida]

See also 
 List of first minority male lawyers and judges in the United States

Other topics of interest 

 List of first women lawyers and judges in the United States
 List of first women lawyers and judges in Florida

References 

 
Minority, Florida, first
Minority, Florida, first
Lists of people from Florida
Florida lawyers
law